Ukraine has participated in the Eurovision Song Contest 17 times since making its debut in 2003.

Since the introduction of the semi-final round in 2004, Ukraine is the only country outside of the "Big Five" to have qualified for the final of every contest they have competed in, and has been placed outside the top-ten only six times. Ukraine has a total of eight top-five placements, with Verka Serduchka and Ani Lorak both finishing second, Zlata Ognevich third, Mika Newton fourth and Go_A fifth, in addition to its wins.

History
Ukraine made its debut in 2003, when Oleksandr Ponomariov finished in 14th place with the song "Hasta la vista".

Later in the year, she supported the Orange Revolution and became an MP for one year as part of the new president's alliance.

In , Ukraine became the first Eastern European country to win the contest twice, when Jamala won with her song "1944". The televote was won by Russia and the jury vote by Australia; Ukraine was second in both, but won with an overall total of 534 points, with Australia second with 511 points and Russia third with 491 points. In , Ukraine was pre-qualified for the final as hosts, however they achieved their worst result to date – 24th place with 36 points.

Ukraine was absent twice from the contest, in 2015 and 2019, for reasons related to the ongoing conflict with Russia:
 Ukrainian broadcaster NTU sat out the 2015 contest because of financial difficulties in relation to the war in Donbas. However, Ukraine broadcast the contest despite not taking part. NTU pledged to bring Ukraine back to the contest for 2016, which was finalized and announced on 16 September 2015.
 Vidbir, the Ukrainian national selection for the 2019 contest, was won by Maruv with "Siren Song". However, the Ukrainian broadcaster UA:PBC required any potential representative in the contest to sign a contract which would forbid them from performing in Russia. The winner Maruv, as well as runners-up Freedom Jazz, Kazka and Brunettes Shoot Blondes, all refused to sign the contract, leading to Ukraine's withdrawal from the contest on 27 February.

In , Go_A won the national selection Vidbir and was set to represent Ukraine with the song "Solovey", before the contest was cancelled due to the COVID-19 pandemic. They were instead internally selected to represent the country  with the song "Shum", with which they finished in fifth place. After the contest, "Shum" entered the Billboard Global 200 at position 158, becoming the first ever Ukrainian-language song to chart there. "Stefania" later went on to surpass the peak of "Shum" on the Billboard Global 200, charting at position 85.

Since the introduction of the semi-final round in 2004, Ukraine is the only country to have qualified for the final of every Eurovision they have competed in (they were absent from the 2015 and 2019 contests). Ukraine has a total of 11 top-ten placements (among those are eight top-five placements). Ukraine's participation and success in the contest has been acknowledged as a factor in the country's growing soft power and international image.

Participation overview 
The following lists Ukraine's entries for the Eurovision Song Contest along with their result.

Trivia

Incidental participation 

Songs by language

Singers by place of origin

Selection process

Hostings

2023 contest 

Awards

Marcel Bezençon Awards

Barbara Dex Award

Related involvement

Heads of delegation

Jury members
A five-member jury panel consisting of music industry professionals is made up for every participating country for the semi-finals and final of the Eurovision Song Contest, ranking all entries except for their own country's contribution. The juries' votes constitute 50% of the overall result alongside televoting.

Commentators and spokespersons

Stage directors

Costume designers

Gallery

See also 
Ukraine in the Eurovision Dance Contest
Ukraine in the Junior Eurovision Song Contest
Ukraine in the Turkvision Song Contest
Russia–Ukraine relations in the Eurovision Song Contest

Notes and references

Notes

References

External links
 Points to and from Ukraine eurovisioncovers.co.uk
 Ukraine in the Eurovision Song Contest - 2010 eurovision-ukraine.com

 
Countries in the Eurovision Song Contest